Micrurus stuarti (Stuart's coral snake) is a species of venomous snake in the family Elapidae. The species is endemic to Guatemala. There are no recognized subspecies.

Etymology
The specific name, stuarti, is in honor of American herpetologist Laurence Cooper Stuart.

Common names
Common names for M. stuarti include Stuart's coral snake, and in Spanish: coral de los volcanes and coral de Stuart.

Description
Its color pattern consists of 13–19 relatively broad black rings and very broad red rings, separated by narrow yellow rings. The dorsal scales are smooth, and the red ones are black-tipped. The number of broad black rings on the tail may vary from 3 to 4, separated by narrow red-brown rings.

Geographic range and habitat
M. stuarti has only been found on the Pacific versant of southwestern Guatemala. Its habitat consists of subtropical wet forest and lower montane wet forest. It may also occur in similar adjacent habitats in southeastern Mexico.

Reproduction
M. stuarti is oviparous.

References

Further reading
Campbell JA, Lamar WW (2004). The Venomous Reptiles of the Western Hemisphere. Ithaca, New York: Comstock Publishing Associates, a Division of Cornell University Press. 870 pp. (in two volumes). .
Roze JA (1967). "A Check List of the New World Venomous Coral Snakes (Elapidae), with Descriptions of New Forms". American Museum Novitates (2287): 1-60. (Micrurus stuarti, new species, pp. 47–49, Figure 17).

stuarti
Reptiles described in 1967
Snakes of Central America
Reptiles of Guatemala
Endemic fauna of Guatemala